The Frontier can refer to:

 The Frontier (1991 film), a 1991 Chilean film directed by Ricardo P. Larrain
 The Frontier (2014 film), an American drama film by Matt Rabinowitz
 The Frontier (2015 film), an American crime film
 The Frontier (Hong Kong), a defunct political group in Hong Kong
 The Frontier (Hong Kong, 2010), a political group in Hong Kong
 The Frontier (website), an investigative news website in Oklahoma, U.S.
 The Frontier (North American history), the American frontier during the period of western expansion
 Fallout: The Frontier, a mod for Fallout: New Vegas.
 The Frontier, previous name for the New Frontier Hotel and Casino

See also
 
 Frontier (disambiguation)
 La Frontera, Chile, the limit between the Spanish/Chilean state and Mapuche territory